Cervid alphaherpesvirus 3 (CvHV-3) is a species of virus in the genus Varicellovirus, subfamily Alphaherpesvirinae, family Herpesviridae, and order Herpesvirales.

References

Alphaherpesvirinae